Limacinula is a genus of fungi within the Coccodiniaceae family. The genus was first named by Franz Xaver Rudolf von Höhnel in 1907.

Species
Limacinula anomala
Limacinula butleri
Limacinula caucasica
Limacinula citricola
Limacinula costaricensis
Limacinula cupularis
Limacinula depressa
Limacinula ficicola
Limacinula indica
Limacinula javanica
Limacinula macrospora
Limacinula malloti
Limacinula martinezii
Limacinula melioloides
Limacinula meridionalis
Limacinula musicola
Limacinula oleae
Limacinula roseospora
Limacinula salicis
Limacinula samoënsis
Limacinula tahitensis
Limacinula tenuis
Limacinula theae
Limacinula zantedeschiae

References

External links
Limacinula at Index Fungorum

Lecanoromycetes genera
Taxa named by Franz Xaver Rudolf von Höhnel